Route 124 is a state highway in southwestern Connecticut running from downtown Darien through the center of New Canaan to the state line in Scotts Corners, New York.

Route description
Route 124 begins as Mansfield Avenue at an intersection with US 1 in downtown Darien near the Darien train station. It proceeds north for about  towards New Canaan. In New Canaan, the road becomes South Avenue and soon meets with the Merritt Parkway at Exit 37. After passing by Saxe Middle School, Route 124 enters the town center of New Canaan, where it has a  overlap with Route 106. After running briefly on Main Street, Route 124 heads out of the town center as Oenoke Ridge. Route 124 runs for another  in the rural part of New Canaan until the New York state line. Across the state line, the road becomes Westchester Avenue in Pound Ridge, a local road. Route 124 is classified as a principal arterial road between US 1 and Route 15 and as a minor arterial road north of Route 15. It carries an average traffic volume of about 7,600 vehicles per day.

History
In the 1920s, the road connecting the town centers of Darien and New Canaan was known as State Highway 302. Another road from Norwalk through New Canaan center and continuing to Pound Ridge in New York was State Highway 184. In the 1932 state highway renumbering, Route 29 was created as a renumbering of old Highway 184. At the same time, Route 123 was created as a renumbering of old Highway 302. Two years later, however, Route 29 south of New Canaan center and Route 123 were swapped and Route 29 now corresponded to the modern Route 124 alignment. At that time, Route 29 continued across the state line as New York Route 137A, which was renumbered to Route 394 by 1947. In 1966, New York State Route 124 was extended southward along old New York Route 394 via an overlap with New York State Route 137. Connecticut renumbered Route 29 to Route 124 to match the number in New York. By 1990, New York shortened its Route 124 to its current southern terminus and the portion corresponding to old New York Route 394 is now a local road.

Major intersections

References

Transportation in Fairfield County, Connecticut
124
Darien, Connecticut
New Canaan, Connecticut